Fabrication may refer to:
 Manufacturing, specifically the crafting of individual parts as a solo product or as part of a larger combined product.

Processes in arts, crafts and manufacturing
Semiconductor device fabrication, the process used to create semiconductor devices and integrated circuits in everyday electronic devices
Art fabrication, production of large or technically difficult artworks
Metal fabrication, the building of metal structures by cutting, bending, and assembling
Prefabrication, assembling components of a structure and transporting them to the site where the structure is to be located

Falsehoods
Fabrication (lie), a type of lie
Fabrication (science), a form of scientific misconduct
Fabricator (intelligence), a source agent or officer that produces fraudulent or false information
Fable, a literary genre
Fiction

See also
Fabricator (disambiguation)
Fab (disambiguation)
 Fabric (disambiguation)
 Fabrication (optics)